Farkas Balázs (born 2 April 1997 in Tatabánya), known locally as Balázs Farkas, is a Hungarian professional squash player. As of November 2018, he was ranked number 165 in the world, and number 1 in Hungary. He won the 2018 Airport Xmas Challenger professional tournament, beating Spaniard Carlos Cornes Ribadas in the 5-game final. He also won the 2022 Odense Open, beating seeded players Ben Coleman, Faraz Khan and, in the final, Sam Todd.

References

1997 births
Living people
Hungarian squash players
Competitors at the 2022 World Games